Anthi Marina was a ferry operated by GA Ferries. She was the first of three 'Spirit' class ferries built for Townsend Thoresen, as MS Spirit of Free Enterprise.

As Spirit of Free Enterprise
Spirit of Free Enterprise operated reliably and successfully on Townsend's routes from her delivery in 1980 until the company was bought by P&O in 1987. In the same year, her identical sister ship Herald of Free Enterprise capsized while leaving Zeebrugge. The design of the ship was not found to be at fault, and after fitting of cameras to allow monitoring of the bow doors from the bridge she continued in service.

As Pride of Kent
In the aftermath of the sinking of Herald of Free Enterprise, P&O moved to change the appearance of the fleet. The Townsend red and white hull with light blue funnels was replaced with the P&O darker blue and white, and the old Townsend "Free Enterprise" names were replaced. Spirit of Free Enterprise became Pride of Kent in late 1987.

In 1991 Pride of Kent was extended in a process often known as "Jumboisation". The ship was cut in half and a new hull and superstructure section 31 metres (102') in length was inserted amidships, raising her passenger capacity to 1,825 and her car capacity to 460. The work cost £20m and took six months.

In 1998 she was renamed P&OSL Kent following the merger of P&O European Ferries and Stena Line on the Dover–Calais route, and later "P O Kent" in August 2002 (following P&O's buyout of Stena Line's 40% share in the joint venture).

In the spring of 2003 the ship was sold by P&O after a brief lay-up period in Dunkerque. She has been replaced by another ship again named Pride of Kent, an extensive rebuild of a former freight ferry.

As Anthi Marina

In 2003 she was named Anthi Marina and operated by GA Ferries between Piraeus, Kos and Rhodes. In addition to the jumboising carried out by P&O she then had a more conventionally shaped bow in place of her original clamshell doors, and an internal ramp to enable her upper car deck to be used in ports without double-deck linkspans. As most Greek ports lack the linkspans found elsewhere, the ship was usually docked stern-on to the quayside and vehicles loaded via a ramp mounted on the ship. She was laid-up in 2009 due to her owner's financial difficulties and she was scrapped in 2012.

Sister ships
Three ships were originally built for Townsend Thoresen for the services between Europe and the UK: Herald of Free Enterprise, Spirit of Free Enterprise and Pride of Free Enterprise. 
Herald of Free Enterprise was scrapped in 1988 after the capsizing at Zeebrugge as Flushing Range.

Pride of Free Enterprise was broken up in late 2015.

This ship, Spirit of Free Enterprise sailed under a range of names on both English Channel as well as between the Greek islands. She was scrapped in September 2012 as MS Anthi Marina.

Ferries of the United Kingdom
1979 ships
Connections across the English Channel